Music for Boys may refer to:
 "Music for Boys", 1981 song by The Suburbs from the album Credit in Heaven
 "Music for Boys", 1991 song by Pet Shop Boys featured on "DJ Culture"